The 2011–12 Iraq Division One is the Iraqi secondary football league. The season began on Sunday 22 January 2012.

League's Format
This season the league contains 47 teams divided in 5 group. A North Group, 2 Central Groups and 2 South Groups. 
From each group, 3 will qualify to the Final Stage.

First round

Group 1 (Northern)

Group 2 (Western and Northeast)

Group 3 (Baghdad)

Group 4 (Middle Euphrates)

Group 5 (Southern)

Second round

Group 1

Group 2

Group 3

Final round

Group 1

Group 2

Final match

References
 Current matches
 Group stage

External links
 Iraq Football Association

Iraq Division One seasons
2011–12 in Iraqi football
Iraq